Outgroup may refer to:

 Outgroup (cladistics), an evolutionary-history concept
 Outgroup (sociology), a social group